Alan Saunders, CMG, OBE (1886–1964) was Inspector-General of Police in Mandatory Palestine between  November 1937  and August 1943.

Saunders was educated at Christ's Hospital. His career was as follows: served Indian Police, 1908–14; war service,
1914–1920, in France, Flanders and Palestine; District Commandant, Jerusalem, Mandatory Palestine
Police, 1920–26; Deputy Inspector-General, 1926–35; OBE 1932; Inspector-General,
Nigeria Police, 1936–37; Inspector-General of Police and Prisons, Mandatory Palestine, 1937;
Member, Palestine Advisory Council, 1937–43; CMG 1941; retired from Colonial Service,
1944; Chief Police Adviser, Allied Military HQ (Greece), 1944; Director, Middle East
Censorship, 1945–46; Commissioner Police, Tripolitania, 1946–1952. Married, 1920, Eva
Strickland (d. 1952): 1 son.

References

1886 births
1964 deaths
British colonial police officers
Mandatory Palestine people of World War II
British people in Mandatory Palestine